Q58 may refer to:
 Q58 (New York City bus)
 Al-Mujadila, a surah of the Quran